León Zárate was an Argentine actor. He appeared in films such as Mateo (1925), La muchacha del circo (1937), El forastero (1937), De la sierra al valle (1938), El patio de la morocha (1951), and Cerro Guanaco (1959).

References

External links
 

Argentine male film actors
20th-century Argentine male actors
Year of birth missing
Year of death missing